Dharangaon railway station serves Dharangaon city in Jalgaon district in the Indian state of Maharashtra. Its code is DXG. It has two platforms. Passenger, MEMU, Express and Superfast trains halt here.

Trains

The following trains halt at Dharangaon railway station in both directions:

 12834/33 Howrah–Ahmedabad Superfast Express
 12655/56 Navjeevan Express
 12843/44 Puri–Ahmedabad Express
 19025/26 Surat–Amravati Express
 19003/04 Khandesh Express

References

Railway stations in Jalgaon district
Mumbai WR railway division
Railway stations opened in 1863